The 1980 Belgian Grand Prix was a Formula One motor race held at Zolder on 4 May 1980. It was the fifth round of the 1980 Formula One season. The race was the 38th Belgian Grand Prix and the seventh to be held at Zolder. The race was held over 72 laps of the 4.262-kilometre circuit for a total race distance of 307 kilometres.

The race was won by French driver Didier Pironi driving a Ligier JS11/15. It was Pironi's debut World Championship victory and he was the fourth driver to win in the first five races of the season. Pironi won by 47 seconds over Australian driver and eventual 1980 champion, Alan Jones driving a Williams FW07B. Third was Jones' Williams Argentine teammate, Carlos Reutemann. It was the first of three wins in Pironi's accident-shortened Formula One career. Jones' second place allowed him to close to within two points of series leader René Arnoux who had collected three points for finishing fourth in his Renault RE20. Piquet was one point behind Jones with Pironi just one point further behind.

Classification

Qualifying

Race

Championship standings after the race

Drivers' Championship standings

Constructors' Championship standings

Note: Only the top five positions are included for both sets of standings.

References

Belgian Grand Prix
Belgian Grand Prix
Grand Prix
Belgian Grand Prix
Circuit Zolder